Il Tempo (meaning Time in English) is a daily Italian newspaper published in Rome, Italy.

History and profile
Il Tempo was founded in Rome by Renato Angiolillo in 1944. At the initial phase the newspaper was a conservative publication and had an anti-communist stance. The paper publishes the Rome edition (available nationally) and other five local editions (Latina, Frosinone, Northern Lazio, Abruzzo and Molise).

In 1996 the former owner, Caltagirone Editore, sold the newspaper to the Italian builder Domenico Bonifaci. On 4 October 2007 the paper switched from broadsheet format to Berliner. Domenico Fisichella, an Italian academic and politician, is among the contributors of the daily.

The 2008 circulation of Il Tempo was 50,651 copies, and 8,525 copies in July 2021

Editors 
 Renato Angiolillo (4 June 1944 – 16 August 1973)
 Leonida Repaci (co-editor, Giugno 1944 – February 1945)
 Gianni Letta (17 August 1973 – 1987)
 Gaspare Barbiellini Amidei (1987 – 30 May 1989)
 Franco Cangini (1 June 1989)
 Marcello Lambertini
 Gianni Mottola
 Maurizio Belpietro
 Giampaolo Cresci
 Mauro Trizzino
 Giuseppe Sanzotta
 Mino Allione
 Franco Bechis
 Gaetano Pedullà
 Giuseppe Sanzotta
 Roberto Arditti
 Mario Sechi
 Sarina Biraghi
 Gian Marco Chiocci current editor
 Sarina Biraghi current co-editor

References

External links
Official website

1944 establishments in Italy
Daily newspapers published in Italy
Italian-language newspapers
Newspapers published in Rome
Publications established in 1944